Renzo Furlan was the defending champion, but did not participate this year.

Gilbert Schaller won the title, defeating Álbert Costa 6–4, 6–2 in the final.

Seeds

  Gilbert Schaller (champion)
  Álbert Costa (final)
  Karol Kučera (first round)
  Tomás Carbonell (quarterfinals)
  Franco Davín (second round)
  Oscar Martinez (first round)
  Jordi Arrese (first round)
  Marc-Kevin Goellner (quarterfinals)

Draw

Finals

Top half

Bottom half

External links
 ATP – 1995 Grand Prix Hassan II Singles draw

Singles